Mitchelltown is an unincorporated community in Bath County, Virginia, in the United States. The community is located along U.S. Route 220, north of Hot Springs, Virginia and south of Warm Springs, Virginia. The community is the location of Valley Supermarket, making it a common artery of the Bath County community.

References

Unincorporated communities in Bath County, Virginia
Unincorporated communities in Virginia